Kharitonovo is a rural locality (a selo) in Tarbagataysky District, Republic of Buryatia, Russia. The population was 168 as of 2010. There are 6 streets.

Geography 
Kharitonovo is located 57 km southwest of Tarbagatay (the district's administrative centre) by road. Barykino is the nearest rural locality.

References 

Rural localities in Tarbagataysky District